"The Bomb! (These Sounds Fall into My Mind)" is a house music track by American musical production team the Bucketheads, released in February 1995. It was later dubbed into the project's sole album, All in the Mind (1995). The single was a commercial hit in the United Kingdom, reaching number five on the UK Singles Chart, while in the United States, it peaked at number 49 on the Billboard Hot 100 and number 41 on the Cash Box Top 100. In 2020, Slant Magazine ranked "The Bomb! (These Sounds Fall into My Mind)" number 48 in their "The 100 Best Dance Songs of All Time" and in 2022, Rolling Stone ranked it number 77 in their "200 Greatest Dance Songs of All Time".

Background and release
Produced by Masters at Work member Kenny "Dope" Gonzalez, the track features samples from Chicago's "Street Player" from their 1979 album Chicago 13. The subtitle of the song is actually a mondegreen; the actual lyric taken from the sample is "Street sounds swirling through my mind..." 

Also sampled is "The Preacher Man" (1993) by Green Velvet. The accompanying video was featured on the Beavis and Butt-head episode "Prank Call," on January 28, 1996. 

The track once served as the entrance music for former World bantamweight and featherweight boxing champion Prince Naseem Hamed, and is featured on the soundtrack for the 2010 film The Switch.

Chart performance
"The Bomb! (These Sounds Fall into My Mind)" was very successful on the charts on several continents, reaching number-one on the Billboard Hot Dance Club Play chart in the United States. 

In Europe, the song was a top 10 hit in Belgium (3), France (4), Iceland (2), Ireland (10),
Scotland (9), Sweden (5), Switzerland (7), and the UK. In the latter, the single peaked at number five in its second week at the UK Singles Chart, on March 5, 1995. But on the UK Dance Chart, the song was a even bigger hit, reaching number two. In 1999, it returned to the UK Dance Chart, this time peaking at number 34. Additionally, "The Bomb! (These Sounds Fall into My Mind)" entered the top 20 in Austria (16), Finland (14), Germany (19), Italy (13), the Netherlands (11) and Spain (12), as well as on the Eurochart Hot 100, where the song hit number 12 in July 1995. Outside Europe, it also made it to number eight on the RPM Dance/Urban chart in Canada, number 11 in Australia, number 21 in New Zealand, number 41 on the US Cash Box Top 100 and number 49 on the US Billboard Hot 100. 

The song was awarded with a silver record in France, with sales of 125,000 singles.

Critical reception
AllMusic editor John Bush declared the song as a "great-sounding fusion of disco-funk and house that works well". Larry Flick from Billboard called it "retro-happy" and "an unassuming li'l jaunt back in time that is packed with more than a savvy twist or two." Chuck Campbell from Knoxville News Sentinel wrote, "The hi-NRG Eurodance number is romping good fun and a prime promotional tool for the album All in the Mind." In his weekly UK chart commentary, James Masterton described it as a "annoyingly catchy 70s-styled dance record that comes complete with tongue-in-cheek video featuring neon lights, platform heels and mile-wide afro haircuts. One of the more unconventional dance records at the moment and possibly by definition one of the best." Dave Piccioni from Music Weeks RM Dance Update commented, "Another all-time dance classic is reworked, rehashed and brutally stripped. Why do they do it? Well, probably because they come out sounding pretty damn good. Kenny Dope has taken a razor blade to Chicago's "Streetplayer", added some rough and ready beats, some latino congas, and presented a disco gem to a new generation of dancers. The result is slamming, the effect on the floor is similar. A simple sample track that is truly gorgeous." 

After the 1995 re-release, another editor, Brad Beatnik, said, "It's the sort of tune that will go down very well on most floors thanks to its carnival atmosphere and very funky disco beats." He added, "A stormer." The magazine's James Hamilton viewed it as "so consistent a seller since late September ['94] that it must surely be the biggest import in ages", describing it as "a marathon bassily burbling percussive 0.125.9bpm underground rhythm groove". John Kilgo from The Network Forty declared it as "a perfect "roll down your windows and crank up the sound" tune". Charles Aaron from Spin stated that "more than a Box novelty, "The Bomb!" is essential '90s funk, a house party on the last car of the D to the A train winding its way from Brooklyn up to Manhattan's disco meat-packing district with conductor Kenny "Dope" Gonzalez mixing electro, hip-hop, house, and Chicago (the group)." In her review of the album, the magazine's Leigh Anne Fitzpatrick concluded that "the single alone will leave you chanting the catchy line "These sounds fall into my mind"."

Music video
The accompanying music video for "The Bomb!" was directed by British directors Guy Ritchie and Alex De Rakoff on a budget of roughly £1,000, being one of their first music video recordings shot on a Super 8 film camera, inspired by some of the Beastie Boys' music video recording styles. It was filmed in London, as can be discerned from the side of the road being driven on with the car's steering wheel on the right side of the car and double-decker buses, and first aired in March 1995.

The video starts off with a black man with an afro waking up because of an alarm clock alongside two blonde haired white women, one with wavy hair and the other with straight hair, the latter of which gets her hair done into pigtails. After they all get themselves ready to go out to have fun, they walk out of the home and the blonde with pigtails is seen driving through London in a Volkswagen Superbug, which the man with an afro later drives while nodding to the blonde with pigtails, who quickly turns away. The gang are seen walking together through a market area and later go into a record shop where the man with an afro finds a record within the store's inventory of this exact song. They all later leave the record store, walk more through the market area, then the man with an afro departures from the two blondes via a kiss on their cheeks, later entering a nightclub called Carwash. 

The video for "The Bomb! (These Sounds Fall into My Mind)" was later published on Altra Moda Music's official YouTube channel on May 13, 2013. It had generated more than 8.7 million views as of December 2022.

Impact and legacy
Mixmag ranked the song number 60 in its "100 Greatest Dance Singles of All Time" list in 1996, adding,

"A quarter of an hour's worth of mirrorball mayhem, Kenny 'Dope' Gonzales' The Bomb is the ultimate disco cutup track. Shatteringly simple, the genius of The Bomb lies in the way it builds up your anticipation with a protracted burst of hard jacking drums and atonal honking before the perfect disco sample soars away into the distance. A massive hit when Positiva licensed it in early 1995, The Bomb kick-started the trend for raiding old disco 12s. Dozens of producers followed its lead, but none of them ever equalled the definitive original article."

DJ Magazine ranked it number 95 in their list of "Top 100 Club Tunes" in 1998.

Slant Magazine ranked the song 65th in its "100 Greatest Dance Songs" list in 2006.

The Guardian featured the song on their "A History of Modern Music: Dance" in 2011.

MTV Dance placed "The Bomb!" at #10 in their list of "The 100 Biggest 90's Dance Anthems of All Time" in November 2011.

Idolator ranked the song number 34 in their ranking of "The 50 Best Pop Singles of 1995" in 2015. John Hamilton commented,

"Who would have predicted that The Karate Kid, Part II balladeer and former lead singer of Chicago, Peter Cetera, would experience a mid-’90s career renaissance as a house music diva? (Not even Miss Cleo!) But that’s exactly what happened when noted remixer/producer Kenny "Dope" Gonzales lifted a vintage slice of Chicago’s "Street Player", dressed it with a funky kick, edited the hell out of the horn section and Cetera’s vocals and turned it all out as "The Bomb!""

BuzzFeed listed the song number 44 in their "The 101 Greatest Dance Songs of the '90s" list in 2017.

Mixmag ranked the song as one of "The 20 Best US Rave Anthems of the '90s" in 2019, adding, "The Bucketheads is a disco-sampling solo project from NYC dance music legend Kenny "Dope" Gonzalez who is also revered for his work as one half of Masters At Work alongside Louie Vega. Sampling the band Chicago's 1979 track 'Street Player', Kenny Dope created a slick piece of house that forces hands in the air everywhere."

Slant Magazine placed the song at number 48 in their list of "The 100 Best Dance Songs of All Time" in 2020. Same year, Tomorrowland included it in their official list of "The Ibiza 500".

Accolades

(*) indicates the list is unordered.

Track listings

 7-inch single "The Bomb! (These Sounds Fall into My Mind)" (radio edit) – 3:22
 "The Bomb! (These Sounds Fall into My Mind)" (Armand Van Helden re-edit) – 8:03

 12-inch maxi 1 - UK "The Bomb! (These Sounds Fall into My Mind)" – 13:58
 "I Wanna Know" – 7:15
 "The Bomb! (These Sounds Fall into My Mind)" (radio edit) – 3:22

 12-inch maxi 2 - UK "The Bomb! (These Sounds Fall into My Mind)" – 14:51
 "The Bomb! (These Sounds Fall into My Mind)" (Armand Van Helden re-edit) – 8:03
 "I Wanna Know" – 7:15

 12-inch maxi - US "The Bomb! (These Sounds Fall into My Mind)" (original mix)
 "The Bomb! (These Sounds Fall into My Mind)" (Johnick Radio Edit)
 "The Bomb! (These Sounds Fall into My Mind)" (bonus beats)

 CD single "The Bomb! (These Sounds Fall into My Mind)" (radio edit) – 3:22
 "The Bomb! (These Sounds Fall into My Mind)" – 14:51

 CD maxi - UK "The Bomb! (These Sounds Fall into My Mind)" (radio edit) – 3:22
 "The Bomb! (These Sounds Fall into My Mind)" – 14:51
 "The Bomb! (These Sounds Fall into My Mind)" (Armand Van Helden re-edit) – 8:03

 CD maxi - US'
 "The Bomb! (These Sounds Fall into My Mind)" (radio edit) – 3:24
 "The Bomb! (These Sounds Fall into My Mind)" (Kenny Dope remix) – 4:32
 "The Bomb! (These Sounds Fall into My Mind)" (jinxx remix) – 5:02
 "The Bomb! (These Sounds Fall into My Mind)" (bonus beats) – 5:06

Charts

Weekly charts

Year-end charts

Certifications

References

1995 singles
American house music songs
The Bucketheads songs
Mondegreens
1994 songs
Songs written by Hawk Wolinski
Songs written by Danny Seraphine
Chicago (band) songs
Positiva Records singles